Maxim Babichev (born 7 March 1986) is a Belarusian handball player for Motor Zaporizhzhia and the Belarusian national team.

References

1986 births
Living people
Belarusian male handball players
Sportspeople from Minsk
Expatriate handball players
Belarusian expatriate sportspeople in Ukraine
HC Motor Zaporizhia players